Millersville University of Pennsylvania (commonly known as Millersville University, The Ville, or MU) is a public university in Millersville, Pennsylvania.  It is one of the fourteen schools that comprise the Pennsylvania State System of Higher Education (PASSHE). Founded in 1855 as the first Normal School in Pennsylvania, Millersville is accredited by the Middle States Association of Colleges and Secondary Schools and the Pennsylvania Department of Education.

First established in 1854 as the Millersville Academy out of the since-demolished Old Main, the academy specialized in a series of workshop-style teacher institutes in response to the 1834 Free School Act of Pennsylvania.

History
Millersville University was established in 1855 as the Lancaster County Normal School, the first state normal school in Pennsylvania.  It subsequently changed its name to Millersville State Normal School in 1859 and Millersville later became a state teachers' college in 1927.  It was renamed Millersville State College in 1959 and officially became the Millersville University of Pennsylvania in 1983. 

In November 1852, the Lancaster County Educational Association met in Strasburg to form an institute for teacher training.  The first institute, which led to the Lancaster County Normal School and received significant support from Thomas H. Burrowes, was held in January 1853. While the Association was working to organize, Lewis M. Hobbs, a popular teacher of the Manor district, lobbied heavily in Manor township for a more permanent training facility for teachers.  Jacob Shenk, a local farmer, donated a tract of five acres (the present-day site of Ganser Library, Biemesderfer Executive Center, and Dutcher Hall) with Hobbs collecting investments from local residents.  On April 17, 1855, Lancaster County Normal School opened with James P. Wickersham as principal and a peak of 147 teachers in attendance.  The school president was Thomas H. Burrowes and the vice president was Lewis M. Hobbs. November 5, 1855, marked the start of the first full session, with a new expansion of the original Academy building that made 96 rooms available for nearly 200 students and their teachers.

Completed in 1894, the Biemesderfer Executive Center, also known as the Old Library, is the centerpiece of Millersville University's campus. The executive committee of the Board of Trustees designated $27,500 for the construction of the library in 1891, with the contract awarded to Lancastrian D.H. Rapp, who submitted the lowest bid in a blind auction.

The Millersville University Library is housed in Ganser Hall. In September 2011, the university closed Ganser Hall for two years for renovations. On August 26, 2013, the Ganser Library reopened as the McNairy Library and Learning Forum at Ganser Hall.

In August 2021, a Millersville student by the name of Matthew Mindler was reported dead. He had been reported missing after not showing up for classes, and having cut off contact with his family. His body was found in Manor Township, Pennsylvania, near the Millersville campus. He was a 19-year-old freshman, and had been a child actor in the past, starring in the film "My Idiot Brother". His death was ruled a suicide.

School principals
 John Fair Stoddard (1855-1856)
 James Pyle Wickersham (1856-1866)
 Edward Brooks (1866-1883)
 Benjamin Franklin Shaub (1883-1887)
 Eliphalet Oram Lyte (1887-1912)
 Peter Monroe Harbold (1912-1918)
 Charles H. Gordinier (1918-1928)

College/university presidents
 Charles H. Gordinier (1928-1929)
 Landis Tanger (1929-1943)
 D. Luke Biemesderfer (1943-1965)
 Robert A. Christie (1965-1968)
 William H. Duncan (1968-1981)
 Joseph A. Caputo (1981-2003)
 Francine G. McNairy (2003-2013)
 John M. Anderson (2013-2018)
 Daniel A. Wubah (2018-)

Campus

Lombardo Welcome Center
On August 29, 2015, local community members Samuel and Dena Lombardo announced a gift to Millersville University of $1.2M for the creation of the university's new Welcome Center and the first state-of-the-art Net-Zero energy building on campus.  Then university president, Dr. Anderson, appropriated over $6.3M in university funds, bringing the final cost to over $7.5M. This building, named the Lombardo Welcome Center, opened in January 2018. Equipped with solar panels, state-of-the-art energy-efficient glass, and an interior design inspired by feng shui principles, the Lombardo Welcome Center will produce as much energy as it consumes.  On the grounds of former Hull Hall, the Lombardo Welcome Center houses the offices of Admissions, Housing & Residential Life, University Marketing and Communications, and the Office of the Vice President for Student Affairs & Enrollment Management.

Francine G. McNairy Library & Learning Forum

Originally built from 1965 to 1967 on the grounds of Old Main, the Helen Ganser Library closed its doors in 2011 for an extensive 2-year renovation project and re-opened in 2013 as the Francine G. McNairy Library & Learning Forum.  The entire complex is named after Millersville's 13th President, Dr. Francine McNairy, who began her career at Millersville first as Provost and Vice President of Academic Affairs before becoming president in 2003. Ganser Hall, named for Helen A. Ganser (1911-1952), librarian and head of the Library Science Department, is the 9-story building that houses the university's academic collection. Serving as the academic heart of campus for over 40 years, Ganser Hall began with the two famous "Bookwalks" of 1967.

Currently, the Library offers a laptop borrowing service for students, has rooms available for reservation, is home to a 24-hour study room and is a part of the EZ-Borrow network, where students, faculty and staff can request a book from another library and arrives in as little as four days to the circulation desk.  The Library also hosts several student-worker positions each semester.

Bus service
The Red Rose Transit Authority (RRTA) provides bus service to Millersville University via the Route 16, MU Xpress, and MU Park City Xpress routes. The Route 16 bus operates daily year-round and connects the university to Lancaster. The MU Xpress bus operates on weekdays while the university is in session as a loop route around the campus. The MU Park City Xpress operates daily while the university is in session and connects the university to the Park City Center shopping mall. Students with their university ID can ride Route 16, MU Xpress, and MU Park City Xpress for free when the university is in session.

Performing arts 
Millersville's Office of Visual and Performing Arts manages two performing arts centers in Lancaster County: The Ware Center and Winter Visual & Performing Arts Center.

Winter Visual & Performing Arts Center

Built as an expansion of Lyte Auditorium in Alumni Hall, the new Charles R. and Anita B Winter Visual and Performing Arts Center has a new entrance off Cottage Avenue in Millersville. The grand opening occurred on Friday, October 12, 2012, after two years of renovations to the original structure, Lyte Auditorium.  Named for local philanthropist Charles Winter, whose daughters are both Millersville graduates, The new Visual and Performing Arts Center, a $26 million construction and renovation project, enhances the original 29,041-square-foot building of 700 seats with a 59,452-square-foot addition. Part of the university's master plan to effectively use and reuse existing land, facilities, and infrastructure, the new Winter Visual & Performing Arts Center houses features a concert hall, recital hall, performance hall, classrooms, a recording studio, piano lab, a music library, faculty offices and more.  Known by students as the VPAC (for Visual and Performing Arts Building), other features of the state-of-the-art building are a scenery shop, soundproof classrooms, several sitting areas, a music library and approximately 20 Soundlok rooms, which are modular sound-isolation rooms for practicing.

The Ware Center 

The Ware Center is a performing arts center in Lancaster, PA and the Lancaster city campus of Millersville University. Located on North Prince Street at the end of Lancaster's Gallery Row, the center is part of the Millersville University's Department of Visual & Performing Arts.
Originally designed by architect Philip Johnson, the $32 million building opened in 2008 as the home of the now defunct Pennsylvania Academy of Music. Since 2010, it has hosted classes for nearly 1,000 Millersville University students during Fall and Spring semesters. Various art exhibits and live performances are held at this venue throughout the year, and the facility can be rented out as a private event venue and banquet hall.

Academics
Millersville University has 8,725 students with a student-faculty ratio of 19:1 and an average class size of 26.

Degree programs and certifications
According to the 2020-2021 undergraduate course catalog Millersville University offers:

 150+ bachelor's degree programs

According to the Graduate and Professional Studies program finder, Millersville University offers 74 graduate programs:

 3 doctoral degree programs
 25 master's degree programs
 46 certificates and certifications

Colleges
 College of Science and Technology
 College of Education and Human Services
 College of Arts, Humanities, and Social Sciences
 The Lombardo College of Business
 College of Graduate Studies and Adult Learning
 Honors College
The Tell School of Music

Athletics
Millersville University sponsors 19 intercollegiate varsity sports which compete in NCAA Division II.

Men's
 Baseball
 Basketball
 Football
 Golf
 Soccer
 Tennis
 Wrestling For rivalry information, see Rupp Cup

Women's
 Basketball
 Cross Country
 Field Hockey – 2014 Division II National Champions
 Golf
 Lacrosse – 1982 AIAW Division III national champion
 Soccer
 Softball
 Swimming
 Tennis
 Track & Field (Indoor)
 Track & Field (Outdoor)
 Volleyball

Intramural and club teams
 Ice Hockey Club (D2) established 1978– 
1991–1992 DVCHC Co-Champions
1992–1993 DVCHC Champions
1993-1994 DVCHC Runner-Up
1993–1994 ACHA National Tournament participant hosted by Siena College
1994–1995 DVCHC Champions
1996–1997 DVCHC Runner-Up
1998–1999 DVCHC Runner-Up
2011–2012 GNCHC Runner-up
2011–2012 GNCHC Western Division Champions
2011–2012 GNCHC Regular Season Champions
2012–2013 GNCHC Runner-Up
2013–2014 GNCHC Runner-Up
2014–2015 CSCHC Regular Season Champions
2021–2022 season: Highest ranking at #13 in ACHA southeast (ranking period 3), Regular season runner-up

 Ice Hockey Club (D3) established 2021
 Men's & Women's Rugby
 Men's Club Lacrosse
 Men's and Women's Cycling Club
 Men's Running Club (Previously Men's Cross Country - 1981 Division II National Champions) (and Track & Field)

Greek life

Honor societies
 Epsilon Pi Tau (Professions in Technology)
 Kappa Delta Pi (Education)
 Omicron Delta Epsilon (Economics)
 Phi Alpha Theta (History)
 Phi Eta Sigma (First-Year Students)
 Phi Kappa Phi (all-discipline)
 Phi Sigma Pi (Honor Fraternity—mixed gender)
 Delta Phi Eta (Honor Sorority)
Omicron Delta Kappa (Millersville established a Chartered Circle of the National Leadership Honor Society, Omicron Delta Kappa (ODK) in 2019. MU is the second institution in PASSHE to have an ODK Circle)

Social fraternities
 Acacia
 Alpha Phi Alpha
 Kappa Alpha Psi
 Lambda Chi Alpha
 Lambda Sigma Upsilon
 Sigma Tau Gamma
 Phi Delta Theta
 Tau Kappa Epsilon

Social sororities
 Alpha Sigma Alpha
 Alpha Sigma Tau
 Alpha Xi Delta
 Delta Sigma Theta
 Delta Zeta
 Mu Sigma Upsilon
 Sigma Gamma Rho
 Sigma Phi Delta (local)
 Zeta Phi Beta
 Chi Upsilon Sigma

Music fraternities
 Phi Mu Alpha Sinfonia

Notable alumni
Brian Axsmith, paleobotanist
Joseph Franklin Biddle, U.S. Congressman from Pennsylvania
Black Thought, lead MC of The Roots from Philadelphia (currently the house band for The Tonight Show starring Jimmy Fallon)
Nicole Brewer, 2005 Miss Pennsylvania, TV news reporter and anchor for KYW-TV in Philadelphia
Marriott Henry Brosius, U.S. Congressman from Pennsylvania
Bob Van Dillen, morning meteorologist, for CNN Headline News
Elizabeth H. Field, physician, immunologist, professor, College of Medicine, University of Iowa
R. William Field, PhD, public health researcher and educator, College of Public Health, University of Iowa
Dondre Gilliam, football player
William Walton Griest, U.S. Congressman from Pennsylvania
Hugh Herr, PhD, Associate Professor, Head of Biomechatronics Research Group at Media Lab, Massachusetts Institute of Technology
Gertrude I. Johnson (1895), co-founder of Johnson and Wales University
Umar Johnson, Psychologist
Chris King, Pennsylvania politician
Jesse Krimes, artist
Donald Kraybill, educator and author on Anabaptists, in particular the Amish
Will Lewis, professional football player, Seattle Seahawks
Eliphalet Oram Lyte, teacher for Millersville and wrote modern "Row Row Row Your Boat"
Malik B of The Roots from Philadelphia (currently the house band for The Tonight Show starring Jimmy Fallon)
Scott Martin, Pennsylvania State Senator since 2016
Tim Mayza, baseball pitcher in the Toronto Blue Jays organization
 Chas McCormick (born 1995), baseball player
Lawrence Nowlan (B.A. 1987), sculptor, designer of the ESPN Espy Award
Robb Riddick, former NFL player
Sean Scott, Arena Football League wide receiver/linebacker for the Philadelphia Soul
William Preston Snyder (1851–1920), president pro tempore of the Pennsylvania Senate and Pennsylvania Auditor General
Jim Testerman, labor leader
Silvia Vasquez-Lavado, global explorer, mountaineer and author
Mary T. Wales (1893), co-founder of Johnson and Wales University
Phil Walker, Basketball Player, member of the world champion 1977-78 Washington Bullets 
Robert Smith Walker, former U.S. Congressman from Pennsylvania

Gallery

References

External links

Millersville Athletics website

 
Education in Lancaster, Pennsylvania
Eastern Pennsylvania Rugby Union
Sports in Lancaster, Pennsylvania
Educational institutions established in 1855
Universities and colleges in Lancaster County, Pennsylvania
1855 establishments in Pennsylvania
Public universities and colleges in Pennsylvania